Artigas is the capital of the Artigas Department of Uruguay. Its name comes from that of the national hero, José Gervasio Artigas, who fought for the emancipation of the River Plate, and sought to create a federative nation from these colonies. As of the census of 2011, it is the eleventh most populous city in the country.

History
It was founded on 12 September 1852 by Don Carlos Catalá as the town of San Eugenio del Cuareim. On 5 September 1884 it became capital of the department. It was renamed Artigas and its status was elevated from villa (town) to ciudad (city) on 31 August 1915.

Economy
Artigas is a centre for trading grain crops (primarily maize) with Argentina and Brazil.   The railroad station and, since 1973, airport are focused on this commerce.

The hills in the area contain significant numbers of precious stones, especially agate and amethyst, which were first found in 1860, since when mining has taken place.   Souvenirs and handicrafts made using these gem stones are produced in Artigas and exported widely.

IUGS geological heritage site
In respect of it being 'the site of world-class amethyst deposits, where the largest amethyst-filled giant geodes were ever found', the International Union of Geological Sciences (IUGS) included the 'Deposits of Amethyst of Los Catalanes Gemological District' in its assemblage of 100 'geological heritage sites' around the world in a listing published in October 2022. The organisation defines an IUGS Geological Heritage Site as 'a key place with geological elements and/or processes of international scientific relevance, used as a reference, and/or with a substantial contribution to the development of geological sciences through history.'

Population
In 2011 Artigas had a population of 40,658.
 
Source: Instituto Nacional de Estadística de Uruguay

Geography
The city is located on the border with Brazil, separated only by a bridge from the town Quaraí of the state Rio Grande do Sul of Brazil.

Climate
Artigas has a humid subtropical climate, described by the Köppen climate classification as Cfa. Summers are warm to hot and winters are cool, with the occurrence of frosts and fog. The precipitation is evenly distributed throughout the year, with an average of 1,293 mm (50.9 in), and the annual average temperature is around 19 °C (66 °F).

Transportation
The city is served by Artigas International Airport.

Places of worship
 San Eugenio del Cuareim, Artigas|St. Eugene of the Cuareim Parish Church (Roman Catholic)

Notable people
 Adelia Silva (1925-2004), educator and writer who had a significant role in elevating the civil rights of Afro-Uruguayans.
 Darwin Núñez (born 1999), footballer
 Pablo Aurrecochea (born 1981), footballer

References

External links
 
INE map of Artigas, Pintadito, Cerro Ejido, Cerro Signorelli and Cerro San Eugenio

Populated places in the Artigas Department
Populated places established in 1852
Brazil–Uruguay border crossings
1852 establishments in Uruguay
First 100 IUGS Geological Heritage Sites